The Office Scandal is a 1929 American drama film directed by Paul L. Stein and starring Phyllis Haver, Raymond Hatton and Margaret Livingston. It was originally made as a silent, but some sound effects a musical score and talking sequences were added.

Cast
 Phyllis Haver as Jerry Cullen  
 Raymond Hatton as Pearson, the City Editor  
 Margaret Livingston as Lillian Tracy  
 Leslie Fenton as Andrew 'Andy' Corbin  
 Dan Wolheim as Champ Tracy  
 Jimmie Adams as Delaney  
 Clarence Geldart as Capt. Day  
 Jimmy Aldine as Freddie, the Copy Boy 
 Louise Carver as Battered Wife 
 Tom O'Brien as Pool Hall Lookout 
 Robert Emmett O'Connor as Judge  
 Florence Wix as Party Guest

References

Bibliography
 Langman, Larry. Destination Hollywood: The Influence of Europeans on American Filmmaking. McFarland, 2000.

External links

1929 films
1929 drama films
Films directed by Paul L. Stein
1920s English-language films
American black-and-white films
Pathé Exchange films
1920s American films